Vitor Frezarin Bueno (born 5 September 1994) is a Brazilian professional footballer who plays as an attacking midfielder for Athletico Paranaense.

Club career

Botafogo-SP
Born in Monte Alto, São Paulo, Bueno started his career at Monte Azul's youth setup before moving to Bahia in 2011. In 2013, he joined Botafogo-SP, initially assigned to the under-20s.

Bueno made his professional debut for the latter on 25 January 2014, coming on as a second-half substitute in a 4–2 home win against Paulista for the Campeonato Paulista championship. On 20 November, after being the club's top goalscorer in the year's Copa Paulista, he extended his contract until 2017.

Bueno scored his first professional goal on 5 April 2015, netting the first in a 2–0 home success over São Paulo.

Santos
On 26 May 2015 Bueno joined Santos on loan until the end of the year, and was initially assigned to the club's under-23 squad. He made his Série A debut on 17 September 2015, coming on as a late substitute in a 4–0 home routing over Atlético Mineiro. He scored his first goal in the category on 6 December, netting his team's fourth in a 5–1 home routing of Atlético Paranaense.

On 16 April 2016, Bueno scored a brace in a 2–0 Paulistão home win against São Bento, which ensured his side in the semifinals of the tournament. He was also a starter in both finals, being crowned champions after a 2–1 win on aggregate over Audax.

On 18 May 2016, Bueno signed a new contract with Santos, running until 2020. He scored his first league goal of the campaign four days later, netting his team's first in a 2–1 home win against Coritiba through a direct free kick.

Bueno became an undisputed starter for Peixe, scoring goals against Botafogo, Sport and São Paulo in the month of June 2016. He repeated the feat in the following month, netting against Ponte Preta, Vitória and Cruzeiro. In September, Vitor scored goals against Corinthians and Santa Cruz, taking his tally up to ten and becoming the club's top goalscorer in the Brasileirão. He was also elected the tournament's Best Newcomer.

Bueno made his Copa Libertadores debut on 9 March 2017, starting in a 1–1 away draw against Sporting Cristal. On 1 July, he suffered a knee injury in a 1–1 away draw against Atlético Goianiense, being sidelined for eight months.

Bueno returned to action on 14 February 2018, playing the last ten minutes in a 2–0 home win against São Caetano.

Dynamo Kyiv (loan)
On 2 August 2018, Bueno signed a two-year loan deal with Ukrainian club Dynamo Kyiv, with Derlis González moving in the opposite direction. He only played a total of 80 minutes during his stay, appearing in three matches as a substitute.

São Paulo

On 3 April 2019, Bueno agreed to a loan deal with São Paulo, signing until December 2020. On 11 December, after being the club's top goalscorer in the top tier with six goals, he signed a permanent four-year contract with Tricolor.

Career statistics

Honours

Club
Santos
Campeonato Paulista: 2016

São Paulo
Campeonato Paulista: 2021

Individual
Campeonato Paulista Best goal: 2016
Campeonato Brasileiro Best Newcomer: 2016

References

External links
Santos FC profile 

1994 births
Living people
Footballers from São Paulo (state)
Brazilian footballers
Association football midfielders
Campeonato Brasileiro Série A players
Botafogo Futebol Clube (SP) players
Santos FC players
São Paulo FC players
Club Athletico Paranaense players
Ukrainian Premier League players
FC Dynamo Kyiv players
Brazilian expatriate footballers
Brazilian expatriate sportspeople in Ukraine
Expatriate footballers in Ukraine
People from Monte Alto, São Paulo